Sara Catharina Alström (born 28 October 1975 in Stockholm) is a Swedish actress. She started acting when she was 11 years old, then together with her younger sister Hanna. She studied at Balettakademien 1993–95 and Kulturama 1994–96 and later in New York City at Actors Studio and Stella Adler Studio of Acting.

Filmography

Film
Badhuset (1989)
Sebastian (1995)
9 millimeter (1997)

Television
Rederiet (1996)
Vänner och fiender (1996)

External links

Swedish Film Database

Swedish film actresses
Swedish television actresses
Actresses from Stockholm
Living people
1975 births
Balettakademien
20th-century Swedish actresses